Les Beehre is a New Zealand former rugby league footballer who represented New Zealand in the 1975 World Cup.

Playing career
Beehre played in the Auckland Rugby League competition and represented Auckland. In 1975 he was selected in the New Zealand national rugby league team for the 1975 World Cup, however did not play in a test match at the tournament. In 1981 Beehre played in the Auckland side that defeated the touring French side 20-10 at Carlaw Park.

References

Living people
New Zealand rugby league players
New Zealand national rugby league team players
Auckland rugby league team players
Rugby league hookers
Place of birth missing (living people)
Year of birth missing (living people)